Sunset Valley is a city in Travis County, Texas. The population was 749 at the time of the 2010 census. An enclave, it is surrounded on all sides by the city of Austin.

Geography

Sunset Valley is located at  (30.225631, –97.816133), 5 miles (8 km) southwest of downtown Austin.

According to the United States Census Bureau, the city has a total area of 1.4 square miles (3.6 km2), all of it land.

History
The first land transaction in the area dates back to 1835, but it wasn't until the early 1950s that the community of Sunset Valley was developed. It was at that time that two brothers, Clarence and M.H. Flournoy purchased a large tract of land for a residential subdivision. The landscape, a wooded valley nestled among rolling hills on the western edge of Austin, inspired the name Sunset Valley. In September 1954, Sunset Valley was incorporated as a town and established a mayor/council form of government. Clinton Vilven became the first mayor of the newly incorporated community. About a month after incorporation, Sunset Valley experienced the first of a series of de-annexations through the years as petitioners applied to deannex various tracts while the town annexed other tracts.

During the 1960s, city services were developed, including the installation of natural gas lines and the paving of roads. The growth of nearby Austin began to impinge upon the boundaries of Sunset Valley in the 1970s, causing disputes over territory and jurisdiction. One example of this tense relationship occurred in 1970, when Sunset Valley residents objected to the Austin Independent School District's plans to build an athletic complex within the corporate limits of the city. A court would later rule in favor of Austin ISD's right to build the complex, which was completed in 1976. Sporadic disputes between the two cities would continue into the 1980s and 1990s.

Sunset Valley's first city hall was completed in 1977 and a police department was established in 1979. By 1990, the population had grown to 327. A wastewater system was constructed in the early 1990s with a grant from the Texas Water Development Board. In 1998, Sunset Valley entered into an inter-local agreement with the city of Austin to provide firefighting services. The population rose to 365 by 2000, an 11.6 percent increase over the 1990 figure.

In 2001, the United States Postal Service officially recognized Sunset Valley as a destination for mail delivery. While a vast majority of the city's land remains residential, commercial development has increased in recent years.

Demographics

As of the census of 2000, there were 365 people, 146 households, and 109 families residing in the city. The population density was 265.0 people per square mile (102.1/km2). There were 154 housing units at an average density of 111.8/sq mi (43.1/km2). The racial makeup of the city was 92.05% White, 0.27% Native American, 1.37% Asian, 4.66% from other races, and 1.64% from two or more races. Hispanic or Latino of any race were 12.33% of the population.

There were 146 households, out of which 27.4% had children under the age of 18 living with them, 63.0% were married couples living together, 8.2% had a female householder with no husband present, and 24.7% were non-families. 15.1% of all households were made up of individuals, and 9.6% had someone living alone who was 65 years of age or older. The average household size was 2.50 and the average family size was 2.82.

In the city, the population was spread out, with 21.6% under the age of 18, 3.3% from 18 to 24, 24.1% from 25 to 44, 33.7% from 45 to 64, and 17.3% who were 65 years of age or older. The median age was 46 years. For every 100 females, there were 91.1 males. For every 100 females age 18 and over, there were 89.4 males.

The median income for a household in the city was $75,470, and the median income for a family was $78,937. Males had a median income of $52,083 versus $34,375 for females. The per capita income for the city was $28,833. About 7.3% of families and 8.7% of the population were below the poverty line, including 16.7% of those under age 18 and 8.5% of those age 65 or over.

Government
The city council consists of one mayor and five council members, one of which is a mayor pro tem. As of 2022, the mayor is Marc Bruner and the council members are Mayor Pro tem Alfonso Carmona, Rudi Rosengarten, Wanda Reetz, Justin Litchfield, and Robert Johnson.

Human resources

Public health 
Emergency medical services are provided by Austin-Travis-County Emergency Medical Services (ATCEMS). The Austin Fire Department's Fire Station 51 and ATCEMS Station Number 38 house emergency medical personnel that service Sunset Valley and the surrounding communities.

Public safety 
Sunset Valley provides funds and a municipal law enforcement agency. Fire protection is provided by the Austin Fire Department.

Police and law enforcement 
The Sunset Valley Police Department (SVPD) is the primary law enforcement agency of Sunset Valley. and as of 2022, consists of 14 employees, 13 sworn officers and one civilian employee. The department is composed of a police chief, an evidence tech/administrative assistant, a lieutenant, one detective sergeant, two patrol sergeants, and eight patrol officers. There are four patrol officers assigned to each patrol sergeant.

Beginning in the early-1950s, a series of city service development began, culminating in a Police Protection organization in 1954 and a police reserve force in 1978. SVPD was formally created in 1979. The SVPD headquarters are at the Sunset Valley City Hall, located at 3205 Jones Rd, Sunset Valley, TX 78745. As of Fiscal Year 2022, the annual budget was $1.8 million.

On September 12, 2017, Lenn Carter replaced intermin Police Chief Lt. Rich Andreucci as Chief of Police. Prior to joining the SVPD, Lenn Carter served as the deputy police chief for the Denton Police Department. Upon becoming Chief of Police, Lenn Carter's primary goal was stated as fostering a sense of trust between community members and the police department. The Chief of Police position is appointed by a City Council vote.

Police services 
Sunset Valley Police Department provides 24-hour law enforcement services to a retail and residential community surrounded entirely by the City of Austin. SVPD enforces the laws of the State of Texas, as well as the City of Sunset Valley Code of Ordinances. The SVPD has a stated focus of providing shared partnerships within their community. As of Fiscal Year 2022, SVPD's budget includes operations for a National Night Out Against Crime, a Community Partnership program, a Crime Prevention program/Child Safety program, and a Neighborhood Watch program.

Notable incidents 
The Sunset Valley Police Department contributed to the investigation of the Austin serial bombings that occurred between March 2 and March 22, 2018. The suspect, 23-year-old Mark Anthony Conditt, was observed on security footage at a FedEx store within Sunset Valley, where multiple explosive packages had been shipped.

Firefighting 
Firefighting services were historically provided by a volunteer department, but was dissolved in September 2011. In 2018, a new fire station was proposed to be built within Sunset Valley city limits. However, the decision was made to build the station within Austin city limits and services both communities. The Austin Fire Department (AFD) now services the citizens of Sunset Valley. The new station, Fire Station 51, is located at 5410 Highway 290 employs both ATCEMS and AFD personnel.

Education

Sunset Valley is within the Austin Independent School District. The city is zoned to Sunset Valley Elementary School in Sunset Valley, Covington Middle School, and Crockett High School.

Gallery

References

External links
 City of Sunset Valley website
 

Cities in Travis County, Texas
Cities in Texas
Cities in Greater Austin
Enclaves in the United States